Following is a list of notable Basque restaurants:

 Aatxe, San Francisco, California, U.S.
 Akelarre, San Sebastián, Spain
 Biko, Mexico City, Mexico

 
Basque